This article gives yearly aviation records under 5 headings: airspeed, range, ceiling, gross take-off weight, and engine power.

References

Citations

Bibliography
Gunston, Bill (ed.): Chronicle of Aviation, Chronicle Communications Ltd., 1992, pp. 48, 52, 58, 66, 78, 86, 96, 104, 112, 124, 134, 144, 154, 166, 176, 184, 192, 200, 210, 220, 228, 236, 250, 260, 270, 282, 292, 302, 312, 322, 332, 344, 354, 364, 376, 390, 400, 412, 424, 436, 450, 462, 472, 480, 488, 496, 506, 516, 524, 534, 542, 552, 562, 572, 582, 590, 600, 610, 620, 630, 640, 648, 658, 668, 680, 688, 698, 706, 716, 724, 734, 742, 750, 758, 766, 774, 782, 790, 798, 806, 812, 820, 826, 834, 842, 852.